Alberto Schiavon (born 2 April 1978 in Rovereto) is an Italian snowboarder. He competed in the men's snowboard cross event at the 2006 Winter Olympics, placing 26th, and the 2010 Winter Olympics, placing 21st.

References

External links
 
 
 
 

1978 births
Living people
Italian male snowboarders
Olympic snowboarders of Italy
Snowboarders at the 2006 Winter Olympics
Snowboarders at the 2010 Winter Olympics
People from Rovereto
Sportspeople from Trentino
21st-century Italian people